Gregory Boyd Penner (born December 18, 1969) is an American businessman and venture capitalist. Penner was named the chairman of Walmart in June 2015. He is the son-in-law of S. Robson Walton and the grandson-in-law of Sam Walton, the founder of Walmart. He is part-owner and CEO of the Denver Broncos.

Early life 
Penner is the son of Clifford and Joyce Penner, sex therapists based in Pasadena, California. They have published sex-advice books from a Christian perspective.

He earned a degree from  Georgetown University, where he majored in international economics, and an MBA from the Stanford Graduate School of Business in 1997.

Career 
He worked as a financial analyst at Goldman Sachs.

Prior to being named Walmart chairman, Penner held a variety of roles at Walmart. He started as a store employee and eventually became the CFO of Walmart Japan. He was appointed to the Walmart board of directors in 2008 and was named vice-chairman in 2014.

Penner is the founder of Madrone Capital Partners, an investment firm located in Menlo Park, California. He is on the board of directors of Baidu, eHarmony, Hyatt Hotels, Teach for America, and co-chair of Charter School Growth Fund.

On August 9, 2022, the NFL owners approved the purchase of the Denver Broncos by a syndicate consisting of Penner, his wife Carrie, S. Robson Walton, Condoleezza Rice, Mellody Hobson, and Sir Lewis Hamilton. The next day, the Broncos announced that Penner would also be taking over as the team's new CEO after Joe Ellis stepped down from the position. In his role, Penner is operating head of the franchise. He will have primary responsibility for the Broncos' day-to-day football and business operations in collaboration with his partners in the Walton-Penner Family Ownership Group.

Personal life
Penner is married to Carrie Walton Penner, the daughter of S. Robson Walton. Penner met his wife while they were undergraduates at Georgetown University. They have four children and live in Atherton, California.

References

External links
 Walmart Corporate Bio

1969 births
Living people
Walton family
Stanford University alumni
Directors of Walmart
Georgetown University alumni
People from Atherton, California
21st-century American businesspeople